Fano  is a town and comune of the province of Pesaro and Urbino in the Marche region of Italy. It is the third city in the region by population after Ancona and Pesaro.

History

An ancient town of Marche, it was known as Fanum Fortunae after a temple of Fortuna located there. Its first mention in history dates from 49 BC, when Julius Caesar held it, along with Pisaurum and Ancona. Caesar Augustus established a colonia, and built a wall, some parts of which remain. In 2 AD  Augustus also built an arch (which is still standing) at the entrance to the town.

In January 271, the Roman Army defeated the Alamanni in the Battle of Fano that took place on the banks of the Metauro river just inland of Fano.

Fano was destroyed by Vitiges' Ostrogoths in AD 538.  It was rebuilt by the Byzantines, becoming the capital of the maritime Pentapolis ("Five Cities") that included also Rimini, Pesaro, Senigallia and Ancona. In 754 it was donated to the Holy See by the Frankish kings.

The Malatesta became lords of the city in 1356 with Galeotto I Malatesta, who was nominally only a vicar of the Popes. Among the others, Pandolfo III resided in the city. Under his son, the famous condottiero Sigismondo Pandolfo Malatesta, Fano was besieged by Papal troops under Federico III da Montefeltro, and returned to the Papal administration. It was later part of the short-lived state of Cesare Borgia, and then part of the duchy of the della Roveres in the Marche.

During the Napoleonic Wars it suffered heavy spoliations; the city had an active role in the Risorgimento. In World War I Fano was several times bombed by the Austro-Hungarian Navy. During World War II it was massively bombed by Allied airplanes due to hit the strategic railway and street bridges crossing the Metauro river. When the Nazis withdrew from the town they destroyed all of the bell towers in the town.

Main sights

Religious structures
Fano Cathedral: (12th century), which was erected over a pre-existing cathedral destroyed by a fire in 1111. The current façade is from the 1920s restoration, but is similar to the original. The interior has a nave and two aisles. No remnants of the town's namesake temple have been uncovered, nor any of the basilica that (we are told) Vitruvius built there.
San Domenico
San Pietro in Valle: 
San Paterniano: (16th century) with a Renaissance cloister. 
San Francesco: church housing the tombs of Pandolfo III Malatesta (designed by Leon Battista Alberti) and his first wife Paola Bianca Malatesta.
Santa Maria Nuova: (1521) Church has an ancient portal and two works by Perugino (Annunciation of Fano and Fano Altarpiece, the latter including perhaps an intervention by Raphael).

Outside the city, in the place called Bellocchi, is the church of St. Sebastian (16th century), for the construction of which parts of the ancient cathedral were used.

Secular structures
Arco d'Augusto: The upper story of this Roman gate was destroyed in a siege conducted on the order of Pope Pius II in 1463, although a bas-relief of it was made by Bernardino di Pietro da Carona in 1513 on an adjacent wall of the annexed church and the loggia of St. Michael, the former having a noteworthy Renaissance portal.
Corte Malatestiana: built after 1357 by Galeotto I Malatesta. The 14th-century section includes a great vaulted hall (probably part of the first residence of the Malatesta in the city) and a small turret. The modern part was built under Pandolfo III in 1413–23. The current edifice was heavily restored in the 20th century, but original are the mullioned windows in Gothic style as well as the staircase and the loggia from a 16th-century restoration. Also noteworthy is the Borgia-Cybo Arch (late 15th century). The palace is connected to the Palazzo del Podestà by a modern bridge, probably present also in the original structure.
Rocca Malatestiana: (Malatesta Castle) was partially destroyed in 1944. The most ancient part dates probably from pre-existing Roman and medieval fortifications. The castle in its current form was begun in 1433 or 1438 by Sigismondo Pandolfo Malatesta. The now missing mastio was erected in 1452. Here Sigismondo's son, Roberto, was besieged by Papal Troops in 1463 and signed the peace treaty that ended the Malatesta domination of Fano.
Museo Civico of Fano: (Archeological Museum and Art Gallery), located inside the Palazzo Malatestiano, contains paintings by Guercino, Michele Giambono, and Giovanni Santi.
Palazzo del Podestà or della Ragione (built from 1229 in Romanesque-Gothic style).  The interiors are in Neoclassicist style, and it houses a museum with archaeological findings, coins, medals, and an art gallery with works by Guido Reni, Domenichino and others.
Fontana della Fortuna (Fountain of Fortune) (17th century).

Culture
 Fano dei Cesari is held annually in July or August for a week.   During the week there are a variety of cultural events ending with a parade in Roman costumes and chariot races.
 The Fano Jazz by The Sea festival is held annually for one week.
 The library, the Biblioteca Federiciana, was established on 17 November 1720.

Sports

Ultimate Frisbee
The Ultimate Frisbee Fano Association was created in 2001. The association has 4 teams: Croccali (mixed), Mirine (women), Spaccamadoni (men) and Angry Gulls (juniors). Since 2001, the association has won 8 Italian championships.

Notable people
 Sebastiano Ceccarini (1703–83), painter
 Clement VIII, Ippolito Aldobrandini (1536–1605),  pope
 Sara Conti, 2001
 Menahem Azariah da Fano  (1548, Fano – Mantua, 1620), famed Rabbi and Kabbalist
 Antonio Giuglini (1825–65), opera tenor
 Fathi Hassan, 1957, Artist
 Carlo Magini (1720–1806), painter
 Roberto Malatesta (c. 1441-1442–1482), condottiero and lord of Rimini, 
 Laura Martinozzi (1639–87), duchess, mother of Mary of Modena
 Bruno Radicioni (1933–97), painter, sculptor and ceramist
 Ruggero Ruggeri (1871-1953), actor
 Giacomo Torelli (1608–78), set designer
 Franco Trappoli, Mayor of Fano (1980–83) and first Buddhist member of the Italian Parliament

International relations

Fano is twinned with:
 Rastatt, Germany
 Saint-Ouen-l'Aumône, France
 St. Albans, United Kingdom
 Stribro, Czech Republic

See also
Roman Catholic Diocese of Fano-Fossombrone-Cagli-Pergola

Notes

External links

 Fano homepage 
 The Fano Club at Baylor University

 
Coastal towns in the Marche
Duchy of the Pentapolis
Roman towns and cities in Italy
Roman sites of the Marche